Run, Tiger, Run is a 1984 Hong Kong comedy film written by Raymond Wong and directed by John Woo. The film marks the first collaboration of  directors John Woo and Tsui Hark.

Plot
Living on the streets homeless boys Teddy and Benny befriend a rich boy who is heir to his grandpa's great fortune. His uncle mistakes all them for his nephews and wanting to steal the inheritance for himself abducts Benny. To save him Teddy teams up with his friends and assassin Mortal Lips to pull off a rescue mission.

Cast
Teddy Robin as Teddy Shit
Bin Bin as Little Benny
Hsiao Hui Ting as Mortal Lips
Hark Tsui as Grandpa Steak

References

External links
 
 
 

1984 films
1984 comedy films
Hong Kong comedy films
Films directed by John Woo
1980s Hong Kong films